2S may refer to: 

 2S gondola lift
 A series of Toyota S engines
 Birdman Chinook 2S, ultralight aircraft
 2s electron in an atomic orbital
 2S, a protein-folding intermediate with two disulphide bonds
 Two-spirit, a term used by some indigenous North Americans to describe certain people in their communities who fulfill a traditional third-gender (or other gender-variant) ceremonial role in their cultures

See also
2 (disambiguation)
S2 (disambiguation)